Tonga–Turkey relations are the foreign relations between Tonga and Turkey. Diplomatic relations between the two countries were established on 26 January 1976.

History 
In 2008, Turkey hosted a meeting of Pacific Islands Foreign Affairs Ministers in Istanbul which brought together Turkey and Pacific Islands Officials for the first time in an international setting. Although most participating countries attended the meeting at a ministerial level, Tonga sent an undersecretary.

In 2014, a Turkish-Pacific Foreign Ministers meeting was held in Istanbul. Representing Tonga, UN Permanent Representative Ambassador Mahe Uliuli Sandhurst Tupouniua attended the meeting. The same year, Turkey made a contribution of US$50,000 to assist Tonga with relief operations following the destruction caused by the powerful tropical cyclone Ian.

In 2017, The state-owned Turkish Cooperation and Coordination Agency (TİKA) stated in their annual report that they assisted Tonga with US$20,000.

Diplomatic representation 
The Turkish ambassador in the New Zealand's capital city of Wellington is also accredited to the Tonga.

See also 

 Foreign relations of Tonga
 Foreign relations of Turkey

References

External links
 Relations between Turkey and Tonga

Turkey
Bilateral relations of Turkey